C. phenolicus may refer to:
 Cryptanaerobacter phenolicus, a bacterium species
 Cryptococcus phenolicus, a fungus species

See also